"" (formerly "";) is the national anthem of Luxembourg. Written by Michel Lentz in 1859 and set to music by Jean Antoine Zinnen in 1864, it is performed at national celebrations, while the royal anthem, or, more accurately, the grand ducal anthem, "De Wilhelmus", is performed at entrances or exits of members of the Grand Ducal Family.

History 
Luxembourgish poet Michel Lentz wrote the poem Ons Heemecht in 1859, and it was set to music by Luxembourgish composer Jean Antoine Zinnen in 1864. The song was first performed in public in Ettelbruck, a town at the confluence of the Alzette and Sauer rivers (both of which are mentioned in the song), on 5 June 1864.

The last line of the chorus of "De Feierwon" became the origin of Luxembourg's national motto.

The first and last stanzas of "Ons Heemecht" were adopted as Luxembourg's national anthem on 17 June 1993, when it was added as one of the official national emblems, alongside the national flag, the national coat of arms and the Grand Duke's Official Birthday.

Lyrics 
The official version is only composed of the first and last stanzas.

Notes

References

External links

 Details, Grand Duchy of Luxembourg (archive link)

1864 songs
European anthems
Luxembourgian songs
National anthem compositions in B-flat major
National anthems
National symbols of Luxembourg